Scotch Run (also known as Scotch Run Creek is a tributary of Black Creek in Luzerne County, Pennsylvania, in the United States. The stream is fed by springs and is located at the base of Nescopeck Mountain. It has not been assessed by the Pennsylvania Fish and Boat Commission.

Course
Scotch Run begins on the southern side of Nescopeck Mountain in Black Creek Township, several hundred feet from the border between Luzerne County and Columbia County. It flows east for a few tenths of a mile and enters a valley. The stream then turns south for a short distance before turning east again. After a few tenths of a mile, it turns east-northeast for several tenths of a mile. It then turns east and crosses a road before reaching its confluence with Black Creek.

Geography and geology

Scotch Run is fed by springs. In 1965, it was noted that the stream had never run dry due to droughts for at least 52 years.

Scotch Run is situated in the vicinity of the southern base of Nescopeck Mountain.

Watershed
Scotch Run is entirely within the United States Geological Survey quadrangle of Nuremberg.

Scotch Run is one of eleven named streams in the watershed of Nescopeck Creek that has not been assessed by the Pennsylvania Fish and Boat Commission.

History
Scotch Run was entered into the Geographic Names Information System on August 1, 1989. Its identifier in the Geographic Names Information System is 1212392. The stream appears on county highway maps published by the Pennsylvania Department of Transportation. It also appears on a 1958 map published by the Pennsylvania Fish Commission.

The first tannery in Black Creek Township was constructed opposite the mouth of Scotch Run. It was situated on a farm that was owned by a person named P. Swoyer in the late 1800s. In 1965, the Hazleton Penn Rod and Gun Club purchased a 35-acre tract of land along the stream.

See also
Barnes Run, next tributary of Black Creek going upstream
List of rivers of Pennsylvania

References

Rivers of Luzerne County, Pennsylvania
Tributaries of Nescopeck Creek
Rivers of Pennsylvania